Ranee can be:

an alternative spelling of the name Rani (Devnagari: रानी)
HMS Ranee - a British escort carrier
Ranee mouse, a rodent
Flying Ranee, an Indian train